Edward Lowell Rogers (April 14, 1876 – October 17, 1971) was an American football player and coach.  He was elected to the College Football Hall of Fame in 1968. Rogers was also elected to the American Indian Athletic Hall of Fame in 1973.

Early life
Rogers was born in the forests of Minnesota to a pioneer lumberman, and Chippewa Indian mother.

Career

Football
Rogers attended school at both Carlisle Institute and the University of Minnesota. Rogers career spanned seven seasons, four as a member of the Redmen teams, which lifted Carlisle to national prominence, and three campaigns at Minnesota. After the close of Carlisle's 1898 season, Rogers and Frank Cayou played for Dickinson College, where they were enrolled in law school, in their Thanksgiving Day loss versus Penn State. Rogers served as team captain at Carlisle in 1900 and Minnesota in 1903. The 1903 Minnesota team had an 11–0–1 record. He was named a third-team All-American by Walter Camp in 1903. As coach at Carlisle, he also played in the game vs Haskell at Francis FIeld in St. Louis, Missouri. While at Minnesota Rogers was a member of professional law fraternity Phi Delta Phi.

Coaching
In 1904 Rogers was head coach at Carlisle, and had a 9–2 record. He was the head coach at St. Thomas from 1905 to 1908, compiling a record of 14–9–1.

Law
The following year after coaching Carlisle, he returned to Minneapolis and began practicing law. He practiced law for 62 years, from 1905 to 1966, retiring at the age of 90.

Head coaching record

References

External links
 

1876 births
1971 deaths
American football ends
19th-century players of American football
Carlisle Indians football coaches
Carlisle Indians football players
St. Thomas (Minnesota) Tommies football coaches
Minnesota Golden Gophers football players
College Football Hall of Fame inductees
Minnesota lawyers
People from Aitkin County, Minnesota
Coaches of American football from Minnesota
Players of American football from Minnesota